Liu Dianzuo (born 26 June 1990) is a Chinese footballer who currently plays for Wuhan Three Towns in the Chinese Super League.

Club career
Liu Dianzuo started his football career in 2006 when he was promoted to China League Two side Dalian Yiteng's first team. He became the club's first-choice goalkeeper in the middle of 2006 season. He earned a trial with Chinese Super League side  Nanchang Hengyuan in 2010 and signed a five-year contract with the club in January 2011. He made his debut for the club on 4 May 2011 in a 3-1 win against Beijing BIT in the first round of the 2011 Chinese FA Cup. He then established himself as regular for the club and played 23 matches during the 2011 season, helping the club avoid relegation. He appeared in every minute of the 2012, 2013 and 2014 league season after the club moved to Shanghai.

On 1 January 2015, Liu transferred to fellow top tier side Guangzhou R&F. He made his debut for the club on 10 February 2015 in a 3-0 win against Warriors FC in the preliminary round of the 2015 AFC Champions League. He lost his starting position to Cheng Yuelei towards the end of the 2015 season.

On 11 February 2016, Liu transferred to Guangzhou R&F's city rivals Guangzhou. He made his debut for the club on 3 May 2016 in a 1-0 win against Sydney FC in the last group match of the 2016 AFC Champions League. Liu played as backup to Zeng Cheng in the 2016 season and made seven league appearances after Zeng's injury in September 2016. After several seasons he would finally go on to displace Zeng as the club's first choice goalkeeper and go on to win the 2019 Chinese Super League title with the club. At the end of the 2021 league season his club would admit that they were in financial difficulties and would allow their first choice players to leave the team.

On 29 April 2022, he signed with newly promoted top tier side Wuhan Three Towns. He would go on to make his debut on 3 June 2022, in a league game against Hebei, which ended in a 4-0 victory. After the game he would go on to establish himself as a regular within the team that won the 2022 Chinese Super League title.

International career
In February 2014, Liu received his first call-up to the Chinese national team during 2015 AFC Asian Cup qualification to play against Iraq; however, he sat on the bench as an unused substitute.

On 10 December 2019, Liu made his international debut in a 1-2 defeat to Japan in the 2019 EAFF E-1 Football Championship.

Career statistics

Club statistics
.

International statistics

Honours

Club
Guangzhou
Chinese Super League: 2016, 2017, 2019
Chinese FA Cup: 2016
Chinese FA Super Cup: 2016, 2017, 2018

Wuhan Three Towns
Chinese Super League: 2022.

References

External links
 
Player profile at Sodasoccer.com

1990 births
Living people
Chinese footballers
Footballers from Dalian
Zhejiang Yiteng F.C. players
Shanghai Shenxin F.C. players
Guangzhou City F.C. players
Guangzhou F.C. players
Chinese Super League players
China League One players
China League Two players
Association football goalkeepers